Mahmoud Abouelelaa (born 4 June 1954) is an Egyptian volleyball player. He competed in the 1984 Summer Olympics.

References

1954 births
Living people
Volleyball players at the 1984 Summer Olympics
Egyptian men's volleyball players
Olympic volleyball players of Egypt